Wolfgang Anton Herrmann (born 18 April 1948) is a German chemist and academic administrator. From 1995 to 2019, he was President of the Technical University of Munich.

Education 
Herrmann attended the Donau-Gymnasium Kelheim, where he passed the Abitur in 1967. He then studied chemistry at the Technical University of Munich on a scholarship from Cusanuswerk, where he wrote his diploma thesis in 1971 under the supervision of Ernst Otto Fischer, a later Nobel Prize laureate. He received his doctorate in 1973 at the University of Regensburg. After a research fellowship of the Deutsche Forschungsgemeinschaft with Philip Skell at the Pennsylvania State University from 1975 to 1976, he habilitated at the University of Regensburg in 1978.

Career 
Herrmann was appointed professor at the University of Regensburg in 1979. In 1982, he transferred to the Goethe University Frankfurt. In 1985, he succeeded Ernst Otto Fischer at the Department of Chemistry of the Technical University of Munich. From 1988 to 1990, he was dean of the department.

In 1995, Herrmann was elected President of the Technical University of Munich. He was reelected in 1999, 2005, 2007 and 2013.

Research 
With an h-index of 106 (According to Scopus), Herrmann is one of the most highly cited German chemists, with more than 800 scientific publications and around 80 patents.

Awards 
 Commander of the French Legion of Honour (2019)
 Bavarian Maximilian Order for Science and Art (2012)
 Bavarian Order of Merit (2007)
 Wilhelm Klemm Prize of the German Chemical Society (1995)
 Member of the German Academy of Sciences Leopoldina (1995)
 Max Planck Research Award of the Humboldt Foundation (1991)
 Gottfried Wilhelm Leibniz Prize of the German Research Foundation (1987)
 Klung Wilhelmy Science Award (1982)

References 

1948 births
People from Kelheim
Officiers of the Légion d'honneur
Recipients of the Cross of the Order of Merit of the Federal Republic of Germany
Gottfried Wilhelm Leibniz Prize winners
Academic staff of the University of Regensburg
Academic staff of Goethe University Frankfurt
Academic staff of the Technical University of Munich
Presidents of the Technical University of Munich
Living people
21st-century German chemists
20th-century German chemists
Technical University of Munich alumni
Members of the German Academy of Sciences Leopoldina